Cvetkovci is a village in the Municipality of Ormož northeastern Slovenia. The area traditionally belonged to the Styria region and is now included in the Drava Statistical Region. The area is also known as Prlekija. The earliest mention of the village is in written documents dating to 1320, when it was called Maierhof.

Remains of a Roman settlement on the merchant road from Poetovio to Savaria were found in the southern part of the village during construction excavations monitored by archaeologists in 1995 and 1997.  Cvetkovci lies on both sides of regional road from Ptuj to Ormož and borders on the villages of Osluševci, Podgorci, and Trgovišče. To the south is the border with Croatia. The Pesnica and Drava rivers flow eastwards just south of the settlement.

The village itself is divided into five hamlets: Zgornje Cvetkovci, Spodnje Cvetkovci, Trnje, Dobrava, and Otok.

The main activity in which the locals are involved is agriculture, with fields on northern side of the village and some agricultural land also to the south. Farmers are involved in cattle breeding and poultry farming. Recently vegetable growing and horse breeding have also become popular. Locals also work in nearby towns such as Ormož, Ptuj, and Maribor.

References

External links 
 Cvetkovci on Geopedia
 Portal Cvetkovci.net - Information site about the village

Populated places in the Municipality of Ormož